Eupithecia subvirens is a moth in the family Geometridae. It is found in California and Oregon.

The wingspan is 19 mm.

References

subvirens
Moths of North America
Fauna of the Sierra Nevada (United States)
Natural history of the California Coast Ranges
Moths described in 1966